Shaotkam is a populated place situated in Pima County, Arizona, United States. Throughout its history, it has been known by various names, including Camote, Comate, Comote, Comoti, Los Camotes, Los Comates, Shaatkam, and Shaot Kam. The name Shaotkam was made official as a result of a Board on Geographic Names decision in 1941.

References

Populated places in Pima County, Arizona